After the Day Before is a 2004 Hungarian crime film directed by Attila Janisch.

References

External links 

2000s crime films
Hungarian crime films